Warchild is a collection of songs from the two previous albums by Paul Di'Anno's Battlezone. Two songs had not been published on any previous Battlezone albums.

The album was released in 1988, and was the last album Paul Di'Anno released as Battlezone until Feel My Pain in 1998.

Track listing
"(Forever) Fighting Back" - 2:21
"Welcome to the Battlezone" - 3:25
"Warchild" - 2:51
"The Land God Gave to Caine" - 7:20
"Too Much to Heart" - 4:46
"Voice on the Radio" - 3:10
"Rising Star" (bonus track) - 4:00
"Rit It Up" - 2:52
"I Don't Wanna Know" - 3:28
"Nuclear Breakdown" - 5:01
"Torch of Hate" - 3:04
"Whispered Rage" - 4:50
"Children of Madness" - 5:29
"Metal Tears" 6:12
"It's Love" - 3:46
"Overloaded" - 3:16
"The Promise" - 3:49
"To the Limit" (bonus track) - 3:53

Tracks 1-6 are from Fighting Back.
Tracks 8-17 are from Children of Madness.
Tracks 7 and 18 were not released on previous Battlezone albums.

Personnel
Paul Di'Anno - lead vocals
Pete West - bass
John Wiggins - guitar
Graham Bath - guitar  (tracks 8-18)
John Hurley - guitar  (tracks 1-7)
Steve Hopgood - drums  (tracks 8-18)
Bob Falck - drums  (tracks 1-7)

References

Paul Di'Anno albums
1988 compilation albums

no:Di'Anno